Nicole Fuchs (née Bass; August 10, 1964 – February 17, 2017) was an American bodybuilder, actress, professional wrestler, and professional wrestling valet. She worked for companies such as Extreme Championship Wrestling, World Wrestling Federation and XPW. From 1993 until her death, she made numerous appearances on The Howard Stern Show and took part as a contestant in Stern's 1993 pay-per-view television event The Miss Howard Stern New Year's Eve Pageant. She then became a member of the show's Wack Pack and appeared in Stern's movie Private Parts.

She made guest appearances on four soap operas: The Bold and the Beautiful and Days of Our Lives in 1991, and General Hospital and Guiding Light in 1992.

Early life 
Bass was born in Middle Village in Queens, New York.

Bodybuilding career 
Bass was a bodybuilder in the late 1980s and throughout the 1990s. She won the 1997 NPC National Bodybuilding Championship.

 1986 IFBB Ms. International – 16th
 1986 NPC Nationals – 8th (HW)
 1987 IFBB North American Championships – 4th (HW)
 1987 NPC USA Championships – 7th (HW)
 1988 NPC Northeastern States – 1st (HW and overall)
 1989 NPC Extravaganza – 3rd (HW)
 1990 NPC Nationals – 2nd (HW)
 1991 IFBB North American Championships – 4th (HW)
 1993 NPC Nationals – 10th (HW)
 1994 NPC Nationals – 6th (HW)
 1995 NPC Nationals – 2nd (HW)
 1996 NPC Nationals – 2nd (HW)
 1997 NPC Nationals – 1st (HW and overall)
 1997 IFBB Ms. Olympia – 14th

Professional wrestling career 
Trained by Extreme Championship Wrestling (ECW), she started her professional wrestling career in Japan in August 1998 for NEO Women's Pro Wrestling, where she won a tournament by defeating Kyoko Inoue. Bass debuted in Extreme Championship Wrestling (ECW) during the first half of 1998. She aligned herself with Justin Credible, Chastity and Jason. She participated in feuds with Tommy Dreamer, Mikey Whipwreck and Beulah McGillicutty.

Bass soon joined the World Wrestling Federation (WWF), debuting as Sable's villainous bodyguard at WrestleMania XV on March 28, 1999. She became involved in an extended feud with Debra McMichael, which culminated in a mixed tag match pitting Bass and Val Venis against Jeff Jarrett and Debra at the 1999 WWF Over the Edge, which took place directly after the death of Owen Hart at that pay-per-view. Bass was then aligned with Venis until she accidentally whacked him with Jarrett's guitar after losing a bikini contest to Debra. The following week, she interfered in a match between Debra and Ivory, with Debra losing her Women's Championship due to Nicole's interference.

This led to a brief alliance between Bass and Ivory, which ended abruptly when Bass left the WWF and filed a lawsuit against the organization for sexual harassment, claiming she was sexually assaulted backstage by Steve Lombardi. In 2003, the case went to court and was ultimately dismissed. Bass continued to wrestle on the independent wrestling circuit and did bookings for public events and for personal training. She wrestled her last match in 2002.

Personal life 
In 2006, Bass was hospitalized due to steroid-influenced pancreatitis. She married Richard "Bob" Fuchs in 1985. In 2005, Bass was involved in a domestic violence case with him. Fuchs died in his sleep in 2013 at age 64.

In September 2000, Bass spent a night in jail after biting a New York police officer who was trying to break up a fight in which Bass was involved. In June 2015, she was arrested for shoplifting in a Queens, NY, supermarket.

At the time of her death, Bass was in a relationship with her business partner, Kristen Marrone.

Death 
On February 16, 2017, girlfriend Kristen Marrone posted a statement on Bass' official Facebook stating that Bass had been hospitalized after being found unconscious at her apartment.  Later that day, she was declared to be medically brain dead following a heart attack. Her family and friends were with her that evening as she was taken off life support. Bass died on February 17 at the age of 52.

Filmography

Championships and accomplishments

Professional wrestling
 Champion Wrestling Federation
 CWF Women's Championship (1 time)
 National Wrestling Alliance
 NWA Worldwide Intergender Championship (1 time)
 NWA New Jersey
 NWA Jersey Women's Championship (1 time)

See also
 List of premature professional wrestling deaths

References

External links 
 
 
 

1964 births
2017 deaths
American female bodybuilders
American female professional wrestlers
Bisexual sportspeople
LGBT people from New York (state)
LGBT professional wrestlers
American LGBT sportspeople
People from Middle Village, Queens
Professional bodybuilders
Professional wrestlers from New York (state)
Professional wrestling managers and valets
American women radio presenters
LGBT bodybuilders
21st-century American women
Professional wrestlers from New York City